Pradeep Nair is an Indian filmmaker from Kerala.

Filmography

Awards

References

 Pradeep Nair (17 August 2016). "Making his mark". Thiruvananthapuram First. Retrieved 05 September 2021.
 Documenting lives of those who document history. The Hindu.
 Pradeep Nair (29 March 2014). A director who made films out of passion. The Hindu.
 Pradeep Nair (11 August 2016). "Making his mark". The Hindu. Retrieved 05 September 2021.
 "Cherukkanum Pennum". Filmibeat. Retrieved 05 September 2021.
 "Oridam (2005)" (24 March 2005). Retrieved 05 September 2021.
 Pradeep Nair (9 September 2018). Here comes a film on food wastage. Times of India.

External links
 

Malayali people
20th-century Indian film directors
Malayalam film directors
Special Mention (feature film) National Film Award winners
21st-century Indian film directors
Artists from Kottayam
Film directors from Kerala
Film producers from Kerala
Screenwriters from Kerala
Malayalam screenwriters
Year of birth missing (living people)
Living people